Hébécrevon is a former commune in the Manche department in Normandy in north-western France. On 1 January 2016, it was merged into the new commune of Thèreval. Hébécrevon was the site of many battles in July 1944 leading to the Allied victory of the St. Lo campaign in July 1944.  It was here that Lt. Henry Victor Crawford died, just yards from the Hebecrevon Church.

See also
Communes of the Manche department

References

Former communes of Manche